Ndebele people or amaNdebele may refer to:

 Northern Ndebele people, an ethnic group native to South Africa found mostly in the Limpopo and Northwest provinces.
 Southern Ndebele people, an ethnic group native to South Africa found mostly in the Mpumalanga and Gauteng provinces.